Daylight Robbery is a British television crime drama series, broadcast on ITV, that ran for two series from 9 September 1999 until 18 December 2000. The series focuses on four Essex housewives struggling with personal and domestic problems. Kathy Lawrence (Michelle Collins), Carol Murphy (Lesley Sharp), Val McArdle (Geraldine Somerville) and Paula Sullivan (Emily Woof) decide to turn to a life of crime when they are held up by an armed gang in the supermarket.

After pulling off an easy first job, the gang gradually become more daring, but find their luck turning when they stage a raid on Kathy's bank. To make matters worse, their haul of loot literally goes up in flames when Kathy's house falls prey to an arson attack, and with the police - led by the dogged Detective Inspector Finch (John Salthouse) - closing in, the women plan one last, desperate throw of the dice. The second series follows Kathy and Paula on the run in Miami, where they fall foul of gang boss Harris (Ramon Tikaram) after stealing his haul of cocaine. They also join forces with two other British housewives, Harriet Howell (Beth Goddard) and Chanice Johnson (Katisha Kenyon). As Harris pursues the women back to England, their old opponent, Detective Inspector Finch, is waiting to finally bring them to justice.

Both series were issued on VHS video on 27 January 2003, becoming two of the last commercially released videos, but have yet to be issued on DVD. 
Also, this rips off the iconic film in Black American cinema, Set It Off, starring Queen Latifah, Jada Pinkett Smith & Vivica Fox. 
In 2001, USA Network bought the rights to the format, commissioning an eight-part remake, with producer Cameron McAllister acting as a consultant producer. However, the remake was unexpectedly cancelled mid-production, and did not make it to air.

Cast
 Michelle Collins as Kathy Lawrence 
 Emily Woof as Paula Sullivan
 Lesley Sharp as Carol Murphy (Series 1)
 Geraldine Somerville as Val McArdle (Series 1)
 Beth Goddard as Harriet Howell (Series 2)
 Katisha Kenyon as Chanice Johnson (Series 2)
 John Salthouse as DI Eddie Finch

Supporting cast
 Martin Crewes as Anthony Sullivan (Series 1—2)
 Ross Boatman as Alan McArdle (Series 1)
 Clarence Smith as Marcus Tanner (Series 1)
 Sasha Tilley as Emma Lawrence (Series 1—2)
 Jack Richards as James Lawrence (Series 1—2)
 Bruce Byron as Phil Murphy (Series 1—2)
 Daniel Newman as Jason Murphy (Series 1)
 Kai Pearce as Stephen Murphy (Series 1—2)
 Nicholas Hewetson as Gavin Howell (Series 2)
 Ollie Peel as Oscar Howell (Series 2)
 Patrick Robinson as Sergeant Chris Bannister (Series 1—2)
 James Bowers as DS Darren Holme (Series 1)
 Romla Walker as DC Paula Marcus (Series 2)
 Brenda Kempner as Pat Rice (Series 1—2)
 Ramon Tikaram as Adrian Harris (Series 2)

Episodes

Series 1 (1999)

Series 2 (2000)

References

External links
 Daylight Robbery at the Internet Movie Database

1999 British television series debuts
2000 British television series endings
1990s British crime television series
2000s British crime television series
1990s British drama television series
2000s British drama television series
ITV television dramas
1990s British television miniseries
English-language television shows
Television series produced at Pinewood Studios
Television shows set in London
2000s British television miniseries